The Asian Table Tennis Championships is a biennial table tennis tournament regarded as continental championships by International Table Tennis Federation (ITTF). From 1952 to 1972, the tournament was organized by the Table Tennis Federation of Asia (TTFA). The Asian Table Tennis Union (ATTU) started its own Asian Championships due to split between national table tennis associations in Asia.

Host cities

All time medal table

Winners of TTFA Asian Championships (1952–1970)

Winners of ATTU Asian Championships (1972–present)

As of 2019

See also
 World Table Tennis Championships
 Asian Cup
 Asian Junior Championships
 List of table tennis players

References

ITTF Statistics
1983-2010 Junior Results
ATTU Website

 
Table tennis competitions
Table tennis in Asia
Recurring sporting events established in 1952